The 1986–87 Scottish Premier Division season was won by Rangers, six points ahead of Celtic. Clydebank and Hamilton Academical were relegated.

Table

Results

Matches 1–22
During matches 1-22 each team plays every other team twice (home and away).

Matches 23–44
During matches 23-44 each team plays every other team twice (home and away).

References
Statto

Scottish Premier Division seasons
1986–87 Scottish Football League
Scot